Pavel Vidanov (born 1 August 1988) is a Bulgarian retired footballer who last played as a defender for Pirin Blagoevgrad.

Career

CSKA Sofia
Born in Sofia, Vidanov began his career with local club CSKA Sofia. He made his professional debut in a 2–0 home win over Botev Plovdiv on 18 April 2007, coming on as a substitute for Tiago Silva. He made his first start on 27 May against Belasitsa Petrich at Tsar Samuil Stadium in the last game of the 2006–07 season.

In January 2008, he was loaned out to Vihren Sandanski for the rest of the season, where he played 14 games in the A Group.

In June 2008, Vidanov returned to CSKA. Since then, he played as regular for CSKA and was also called up to the national team of his country.

Rapid București (loan)
On 19 February 2011, Vidanov was loaned out to the Romanian club Rapid București with an option for purchase at the end of the 2010–11 Liga I season. He made his debut in a 3–2 away loss against Gloria Bistrița on 18 March. Vidanov returned to CSKA at the end of the season having made only 6 appearances in Liga I.

Zagłębie Lubin
On 21 January 2012, Vidanov joined Polish club Zagłębie Lubin. He made his Ekstraklasa debut on 19 February, in a 2–2 home draw against Wisła Kraków. Vidanov's contract with Zagłębie expired at the end of the 2013–14 season and he left the club as a free agent.

Trapani
On 26 October 2014, Vidanov signed a one-year contract with Italian Serie B club Trapani Calcio after successfully completing a trial period. He made his debut on 8 November against Frosinone but was replaced through injury after 36 minutes. Vidanov scored his first goal in a 2–2 home draw against Perugia on 12 December.

Lokomotiv Plovdiv
Vidanov joined Lokomotiv Plovdiv on 3 October 2016.

Beroe
On 19 June 2017, Vidanov signed with Beroe Stara Zagora. He left the club at the end of the 2017–18 season.

International
On 12 August 2009, Vidanov made his debut for the senior team in a friendly match against Latvia after coming on as a substitute for Blagoy Georgiev in the 75th minute.

Honours
 CSKA Sofia
 Bulgarian Cup (1): 2010–11
 Bulgarian Supercup (1): 2008

References

External links
 
 
 Career Statistics at The Guardian
 

1988 births
Living people
Footballers from Sofia
Bulgarian footballers
Bulgaria international footballers
Bulgaria under-21 international footballers
PFC CSKA Sofia players
OFC Vihren Sandanski players
FC Rapid București players
Zagłębie Lubin players
Trapani Calcio players
Górnik Zabrze players
PFC Lokomotiv Plovdiv players
PFC Beroe Stara Zagora players
PFC Slavia Sofia players
FK Atlantas players
OFC Pirin Blagoevgrad players
First Professional Football League (Bulgaria) players
Liga I players
Ekstraklasa players
Serie B players
Association football defenders
Bulgarian expatriate footballers
Expatriate footballers in Romania
Bulgarian expatriate sportspeople in Romania
Expatriate footballers in Poland
Bulgarian expatriate sportspeople in Poland
Expatriate footballers in Italy
Bulgarian expatriate sportspeople in Italy
Expatriate footballers in Lithuania
Bulgarian expatriate sportspeople in Lithuania